Adventure Bay may refer to:

 Adventure Bay, Tasmania
 Adventure Bay, Undine Harbour, South Georgia
 Adventure Bay, the fictional main setting of PAW Patrol
 Fame City Waterworks, later Adventure Bay, a defunct water park in Houston, Texas, US